Porcellanite or porcelanite, is a hard, dense rock somewhat similar in appearance to unglazed porcelain. It is often an impure variety of chert containing clay and calcareous matter. Porcellanite has been found, for example, in Northern Ireland, Poland and the Czech Republic.

Tievebulliagh

At Tievebulliagh, Northern Ireland, porcellanite is a tough contact metamorphosed hornfels formed from a lateritic soil horizon within a basaltic intrusive/extrusive sequence. The rock is black to dark grey in colour. Tievebulliagh is the site of a Neolithic axe or stone tool quarry, and there is another quarry on Rathlin Island. It is likely that roughouts or roughly-shaped prehistoric tools (celts) were chipped on site before transportation both within Ireland and over the Irish Sea to Britain. It is also likely that the final polish would have been performed near the site of use in cutting vegetation and trees. It was commonly polished on grooved blocks of hard sandstone.

References 

Sedimentary rocks
Chert
Metamorphic rocks
Archaeology of Northern Ireland
Geology of Northern Ireland